BR-307 is a Brazilian federal highway in the municipality of São Gabriel da Cachoeira, Amazonas that goes from the main town on the Rio Negro to the Cucuí district some  north at the triple border with Venezuela and Colombia.

Route
The road goes through indigenous land such as the Balaio Indigenous Territory and Cué-cué/Marabitanas Indigenous Territory as well as Pico da Neblina National Park. 
It passes through the  Morro dos Seis Lagos Biological Reserve, created in 1990.

The  unpaved road is largely impassible due to neglect, destroyed bridges, and heavy rainfall.

History
This plan had as one of its goals populating Amazônia with displaced or landless residents from the drought-prone Northeast. None of the three massive road projects were ever completed. BR-307 is still officially listed in government documents as being planned to extend a total of 1695.3 km from Marechal Thaumaturgo, Acre north to the Venezuelan border. None of the route south of the Rio Negro was ever operational.

In 2015, the former mayor of São Gabriel da Cachoeira was accused of misappropriating funds that were designated for road maintenance on BR-307.

See also
Brazilian Miracle
Programa de Aceleração do Crescimento

References

External links
Decreto-Lei Nº 1.106, de 16 de junho de 1970 

Federal highways in Brazil